Culture of Volume is the second album by the British electronic musician East India Youth, released 6 April 2015 on XL Recordings.

Production
Culture of Volume is the first East India Youth album released by the Richard Russell-owned label XL Recordings. Most of the production and the recording was completed in William Doyle's home in London. According to Doyle, the album's name comes from a fragment of a verse in Rick Holland's poem 'Monument'. Culture of Volume was mixed by Doyle and Graham Sutton, and the album artwork was made by Dan Tombs.

Release
XL Recordings announced in late January that Culture of Volume was scheduled to be released on 6 April in Europe, and 7 April in the US. Besides digital download, the album is pressed in limited 100 signed vinyl and 50 signed CDs. On 3 February, Doyle shared the song "Carousel" with his fans on Twitter, describing it as a very important song to him personally.

Track listing

Charts

Weekly charts

References

East India Youth albums
2015 albums
XL Recordings albums
Experimental pop albums